Odostomia gouldii is a species of sea snail, a marine gastropod mollusc in the family Pyramidellidae, the pyrams and their allies.

Description
The elongate-conic shell is of medium size, measuring 6.1 mm. It is yellowish-white, the exterior surface marked by irregular tumescences, giving it a much worn appearance. The three whorls of the protoconch  are deeply immersed, having their axis at about a right angle to the axis of the succeeding turns. The six whorls of the teleoconch are moderately well rounded and faintly shouldered at the summit. The sutures are simple and well marked. The periphery and the base of the body whorl is  well rounded, the latter somewhat elongated. The umbilicus is faint. The pyriform aperture is quite large. The posterior angle is obtuse. The outer lip is moderately thick. The columella is very oblique, fairly strong, revolute, with a strong fold somewhat anterior to its insertion. The parietal wall is covered with a fairly strong callus.

Distribution
This species occurs in the Pacific Ocean off Washington (state)

References

External links
 To World Register of Marine Species
 To ITIS

gouldii
Gastropods described in 1864